Wit FM is a French local radio station, based in Bègles near Bordeaux, created in 1988 and owned by Sud Radio Groupe.

History
In June 1988, Wit FM was created in Bordeaux, by Jean-Louis Marin, former journalist of RMC and a member of the Sud Radio team. Wit FM took over the defunct frequencies of the Parisian radio station Hit FM, they have chosen a similar name to that of the Hit FM station in order to keep its predecessor's listeners. Sometime later, the station was acquired by Claude Bez, president of the sports club Girondins de Bordeaux.

In 1989, Wit FM is sold for 75% to Sud Radio.

In 2006, the radio station along with Sud Radio was bought by the Orléans-based group Start, which renamed it to Sud Radio Groupe in 2010.

Identity of WitFM

Logos

Slogans
 1988–2007 : L'esprit radio !
 2007–2008 : Hit Radio & Cash
 2008–2022 : Bien + que des hits !
 Since 2 December 2022 : Du cœur et des hits

References

External links

Wit FM

Radio stations in France
Mass media in Bordeaux
Radio stations established in 1988